In ancient Egyptian grammar, a filiative nomen (plural filiative nomina) is a name, typically of a pharaoh, that incorporates the name(s) of the person's father and possibly grandfather.

References

See also
 Nomen (Ancient Egypt)
 Prenomen (Ancient Egypt)

Ancient Egyptian language